Wusterhausen (official name Wusterhausen/Dosse) is a municipality in the Ostprignitz-Ruppin district, in northwestern Brandenburg, Germany. It is situated on the river Dosse, 7 km southeast of Kyritz, and 75 km northwest of Berlin.

Demography

People 
 Dieter Helm (1941–2022), farmer and politician
 Hermann Wagener (1815-1889), journalist and politician

References

Localities in Ostprignitz-Ruppin